The Gentlemen is a 2019 action comedy film written, directed and produced by Guy Ritchie, who developed the story along with Ivan Atkinson and Marn Davies. The film stars Matthew McConaughey, Charlie Hunnam, Henry Golding, Michelle Dockery, Jeremy Strong, Eddie Marsan, Colin Farrell, and Hugh Grant. It follows an American cannabis wholesaler in England who is looking to sell his business, setting off a chain of blackmail and schemes to undermine him.

The Gentlemen premiered at the Curzon Mayfair Cinema on December 3, 2019, and was released theatrically in the United Kingdom on January 1, 2020, by Entertainment Film Distributors, and in the United States on January 24, 2020, by STXfilms. It received generally positive reviews from critics and was also a commercial success, grossing $115 million worldwide against its $22 million budget. A spin-off television series is in development at Netflix with Theo James starring in a lead role, alongside Vinnie Jones, Kaya Scodelario, Giancarlo Esposito, Daniel Ings, Joely Richardson and Peter Serafinowicz as the rest of the cast.

Plot
Big Dave, editor of the Daily Print tabloid, is snubbed by cannabis baron Mickey Pearson at a party and hires private investigator Fletcher to investigate Pearson's links to Lord (Charles) Pressfield. Pressfield, a duke, has a heroin-addicted daughter named Laura. Fletcher offers to sell his findings (typed up as a screenplay entitled Bush) to Pearson's right-hand man, Raymond, for £20 million.

Born into poverty in the United States, Pearson won a Rhodes Scholarship to Oxford University, where he began selling marijuana to fellow students before dropping out and building his criminal empire by violence. He now plans to sell his business to American billionaire Matthew Berger for £400m so he can retire peacefully with his wife, Rosalind. Pearson shows Berger one of the labs where he grows his cannabis under the estates of aristocratic landlords, who need cash for the upkeep of their stately homes. Pearson is later approached by Dry Eye, an underboss for Chinese gangster Lord George. Dry Eye offers to buy out Pearson's business, but he refuses. Pearson's lab is then raided by amateur MMA fighters and aspiring YouTubers "The Toddlers" who overpower the lab's guards, steal a vanload of marijuana and upload a rap video of their caper online. The fighters' trainer, known only as Coach, orders them to delete the video and is horrified when he discovers that the cannabis belongs to Pearson.

Following the raid, Pearson begins transferring his cannabis plants out of the estates as a safety precaution, while having Raymond investigate how the Toddlers learned of the lab's location. Also, at the request of Pressfield, he agrees to bring Laura home. Raymond retrieves her from a council estate where she is living with several other addicts. However, in a brawl with her flatmates one of Raymond's men accidentally pushes Aslan, a young Russian man, off the balcony to his death. Although Laura is then returned to her parents, she later dies of a heroin overdose.

Coach visits Raymond, apologises for his students' actions, and offers his services as penance. Coach has captured Phuc, a henchman of Dry Eye's who had informed Coach's crew about the lab location, although Phuc gets fatally run over by a train in a botched escape attempt. Pearson threatens Lord George for going after his lab and destroys one of his heroin labs in retaliation. George chastises Dry Eye for his insubordination in attacking Pearson and offering to buy him out; George nods to a henchman to execute Dry Eye, but the man executes George instead.

Unknown to Pearson, Dry Eye is in league with Berger, who had wanted Pearson's business disrupted to reduce the price. Dry Eye has taken Lord George's place and still hopes to take Pearson's empire for himself. Dry Eye tries to kidnap Rosalind, who kills Dry Eye's men before she runs out of bullets in her two-shot derringer. Raymond kills an assassin sent to kill Pearson; the two rush to Rosalind and Pearson fatally shoots Dry Eye as he is about to rape her. Fletcher ends his story and Raymond orders him to leave his house.

Fletcher has merely confirmed Pearson's suspicions about the link between Dry Eye and Berger. Raymond orders The Toddlers to capture Big Dave. They drug him and film him having sex with a pig, threatening to post it online unless he drops his investigation and publishes nothing. Pearson and Berger meet up again in a frozen fish plant, actually a cover for Pearson's European distribution operation. Berger drops his offer to £130 million, on account of the recent disruptions it has experienced, but Pearson reveals his knowledge of Berger's plan, shows him Dry Eye's frozen body and tells him he is keeping his business. Pearson forces Berger inside a refrigerator, where he will freeze to death unless he transfers £270 million compensation for the blood he now has on his hands and the cost of restoring order. Pearson admits he is not "emotional about the money" but because Rosalind was assaulted and seconds from rape, he demands "a pound of flesh" from Berger's own body, anywhere Berger chooses, as compensation for this indiscretion.

Fletcher approaches Raymond again for his payment, but Raymond reveals that he was tailing Fletcher all along. The Toddlers have stolen his stashes of evidence after Raymond placed a tracker on him during their last encounter. Fletcher reveals that he has also sold info to Aslan's father, a Russian oligarch and former KGB agent. The assassin whom Raymond killed earlier was one of the Russians. Coach kills two Russian hitmen sent to kill Raymond, while Fletcher escapes in the chaos. Pearson is kidnapped by two other Russians, but they are ambushed by Coach's students who want to "solve Coach's problem". They riddle the car with bullets, killing the Russians and allowing Pearson to escape. Later, Fletcher decides to pitch the story as a film to Miramax. After his meeting, he gets into a cab only to realize that Raymond is the driver. Upon learning of Fletcher's capture, Pearson and Rosalind return to their cannabis empire and celebrate in each other's company.

Cast

Production
It was announced in May 2018 that Guy Ritchie would write and direct The Gentlemen, a film that would be in the same spirit as his earlier Lock, Stock and Two Smoking Barrels and Snatch. The project was unveiled at the 2018 Cannes Film Festival by CAA Media Finance and Rocket Science where Miramax acquired the distribution rights. Filming was expected to begin in October. In October, Matthew McConaughey, Kate Beckinsale, Henry Golding and Hugh Grant were cast, with Jeremy Strong, Jason Wong and Colin Farrell joining in November. Later, Michelle Dockery signed on, replacing Beckinsale in her role. In December 2018, Lyne Renée was added as well.

Principal photography began in November 2018. Filming locations included West London Film Studios, Longcross Studios, The Princess Victoria pub in Shepherd's Bush and Brompton Cemetery.

Release
In February 2019, STX Entertainment acquired U.S. distribution rights to the film from Miramax for $7 million. The film had its world premiere as a VIP special screening at Curzon Mayfair on December 3, 2019. It was theatrically released in the UK on January 1, 2020, and in the US on January 24, 2020. The studio spent around $25 million on promoting the film.

The Gentlemen was released on home media and video on demand on March 24, 2020. It was previously set for a home media release on April 7, but was moved up due to the COVID-19 pandemic. It was released on DVD, Blu-ray, and Ultra HD Blu-ray on April 21, 2020, by Universal Studios Home Entertainment.

Reception

Box office
The Gentlemen grossed $15.9 million in the United Kingdom, $36.5 million in the United States and Canada, and $62.8 million in other countries, for a worldwide total of $115.2 million.

In the United States and Canada, the film was released alongside The Turning, and was projected to gross around $10 million from 2,100 theaters in its opening weekend. The film made $3.1 million on its first day, including $725,000 from Thursday night previews. It went on to debut to $10.6 million, finishing fourth at the box office. It then made $6 million in its second weekend, finishing fifth. In its third and fourth weekends the film made a respective $4.2 million and $2.7 million.

Critical response
The website's critics consensus reads, "It may not win writer-director Guy Ritchie many new converts, but for those already attuned to the filmmaker's brash wavelength, The Gentlemen stands tall." On Metacritic, the film has a weighted average score of 51 out of 100, based on 44 critics, indicating "mixed or average reviews". Audiences polled by CinemaScore gave the film an average grade of "B+" on an A+ to F scale, while PostTrak reported an average 3.5 out of 5 stars, with 48% of people saying they would definitely recommend it.

Writing for Entertainment Weekly, Leah Greenblatt rated the film a "B−" and found it to come up short when compared to Ritchie's previous crime films, stating, "The Gentlemen is nothing if not a callback to the Locks of yesteryear, star-stacked and defibrillated with enough juice to jolt a gorilla out of cardiac arrest."

The movie was also criticized for racism. Writing for The Guardian, Simran Hans writes "By Ritchie’s logic, white weed kingpins are entrepreneurs with the moral high ground; Asian heroin-pushers are 'the killers of worlds."' Gary M. Kramer, writing for Salon, said "Ritchie thinks casual racism is funny, and the film's Asian characters are all called the derogatory c-word: 'Chinamen.' Most everyone else on screen is called the other, equally taboo c-word, which is meant to be cheeky, but it is not. It is offensive; cringe-inducing rather than amusing, and one wonders when the juvenile Ritchie is going to grow the f**k up and quit being so conceited about his smartassery."

Accolades

Television series
In October 2020, Miramax Television started development on a spin-off television series of the film, with Ritchie helming the project. In November 2022, the series was officially greenlit by Netflix. The pilot was written by Guy Ritchie and Matthew Read. Ritchie will direct the first two episodes and serves as executive producer alongside Ivan Atkinson, Marn Davies, and Bill Block. The Gentleman will star Theo James, alongside Vinnie Jones, Kaya Scodelario, Giancarlo Esposito, Daniel Ings, Joely Richardson, Peter Serafinowicz, Alexis Rodney and Chanel Cresswell.

References

External links
 
 

2019 films
2019 crime action films
2010s crime comedy films
2019 action comedy films
American crime action films
American gangster films
American films about cannabis
British crime action films
British gangster films
British films about cannabis
Films adapted into television shows
Films directed by Guy Ritchie
Films shot in London
Films set in London
Films with screenplays by Guy Ritchie
STX Entertainment films
Miramax films
Films produced by Bill Block
Films about organized crime in the United States
Films about organised crime in the United Kingdom
2010s English-language films
2010s American films
2010s British films